The Honourable Alfred John Francis Egerton (6 February 1854 – 25 September 1890), was a British Conservative politician from the Egerton family.

He was the youngest son of the Second Earl of Ellesmere and Lady Mary Campbell. He was educated at Eton College, joining the Grenadier Guards aged 18 and served seven years as a lieutenant. He married Isabelle Clarisande Gertrude Gorges in 1881.

In 1885 he was elected as Conservative MP for Eccles in Lancashire, and was re-elected in the following year. His last public address was at Worsley Primrose League on 7 July 1888.

He died after a long illness (consumption) at Burwood House, his mother's residence in 1890, aged 36.

References

External links 
 
 

1854 births
1890 deaths
People educated at Eton College
Conservative Party (UK) MPs for English constituencies
UK MPs 1885–1886
Alfred
Alfred
UK MPs 1886–1892
Grenadier Guards officers
Younger sons of earls